Gwilym Bradley (born 10 September 2000) is a Welsh rugby union player, currently playing for Pro14 side Cardiff Rugby academy. His preferred position is flanker.

Professional career
Born in Kingston upon Thames, Bradley played youth rugby for Cobham RFC before joining the London Irish academy. After leaving the academy, Bradley enrolled at University of Bath, pursuing a degree in Economics. While attending Bath, he played for their rugby club in the BUCS Super Rugby tournament.

A member of the Welsh Exiles programme, Bradley played for Wales U19 and U20.

Bradley is a member of the Cardiff academy. He made his Cardiff debut in Round 7 of the 2020–21 Pro14 against Leinster.

Personal life 
Bradley grew up in south west London. He qualifies for Wales through his Newport-born mother, supporting Wales throughout his childhood.

References

External links
itsrugby.co.uk Profile

2000 births
Living people
Welsh rugby union players
Cardiff Rugby players
Rugby union flankers